The following is a list of streets and alleys that are within or pass through San Francisco's Chinatown.

References

External links
 
 

Chinatown, San Francisco
Streets and alleys in Chinatown